YDG may stand for:

 YDG, IATA code of Digby/Annapolis Regional Airport
 Yang Dong-geun, South Korean hip-hop artist (born 1979)
 Yeni Demokratik Gençlik, youth organization of the Confederation of Workers from Turkey in Europe

See also 
 YDG SRA protein domain
 YDG-H, rebel group of young PKK sympathizers in Turkey